John Andrew Mader (born October 22, 1963) is an American drummer who has performed and recorded with such successful acts as Pat Benatar, Steve Miller, Josh Groban, Bonnie Raitt, Booker T. Jones, the Family Stone, Gregg Allman, Joe Satriani, Patti Austin, and Billy Sheehan among others. He has also played drums on such hit musicals as Rent, Wicked, Mamma Mia!, The Lion King, and Hamilton.

Early life
John Mader was born on October 22, 1963, the son of Ruth (née Markham), a cab dispatcher, and Norman Mader, a cab driver who was also a professional musician.  While in kindergarten he attended a talent show at school and saw a young boy playing drums and was inspired to learn to play the drums and went on to play in the school orchestra, marching band, choir, jazz band, and musicals in elementary and primary school.

During high school he performed and toured with the Pepsi sponsored music group, Youth of America, replacing Will Kennedy of The Yellow Jackets.  They were a big band with a horn section, choir, and dancers and performed at festivals and corporate events in the San Francisco bay area.

Music career
Mader began working as a professional musician at seventeen years old and joined the San Francisco Bay Area band The Uptones when he was twenty one years old. The Uptones toured the U.S. opening for Billy Idol, UB40, Oingo Boingo, Red Hot Chili Peppers, and many others, as well as winning a BAMMY Award.

He has performed with jazz recording artists Pee Wee Ellis, Fred Wesley, Maceo Parker, and Roy Hargrove, among others.

As a member of the band with Ryan Downe, Mader performed on two U.S tours opening for The Who on the Quadrophenia Tour in 1997. Downe was signed to Rocket Records, a label created by Elton John.

He was asked to play drums on the film score for Blindspotting, by Daveed Diggs (who wrote, produced and starred in the film) and had performed in the original cast of Hamilton.

Musical theater
Mader played drums for the world premiere of the Tony Award winning Wicked (original New York cast) and The Lion King (San Francisco). He then relocated to Los Angeles to play drums for Hamilton.

 Rent
 Wicked
 Mamma Mia!
 The Lion King
 Hamilton

Equipment endorsements
 Dixon Drums (Artisan Maple series - 14 snare, 22 bass, and 10, 12, 14, 16 toms)
 Vic Firth (drum sticks)
 Sabian (Evolution series Ride and Crashes and Artisan Hi Hats)

Discography

References

1963 births
20th-century American drummers
21st-century American drummers
American male drummers
Living people
20th-century American male musicians
21st-century American male musicians